The Applejacks may refer to:

 The Applejacks (British band)
 The Applejacks (US band)
 The Applejacks (Dutch band)

See also
 Applejack (disambiguation)